This is a list of Royal Air Force groups. The group is a formation just below command level.

There are currently only six groups in operation: No. 1 Group, No. 2 Group, No. 11 Group, No. 22 Group and No. 83 Group. These are shown in bold in the table below.

See also
Command (military formation)
Royal Air Force
British Armed Forces

References

Royal Air Force groups
 
Gro